The Piccard family (Not to be confused with the French region of Picard) are a Swiss family of adventurers, explorers and scientists. They collectively have broken several world records in exploration, particularly with balloons. The Star Trek character Jean-Luc Picard was named in honour of this family.

Members include: 

 Auguste Piccard (1884–1962), physicist, balloonist, hydronaut
 Bertrand Piccard (born 1958), psychiatrist, balloonist, and solar plane pilot
 Don Piccard (1926–2020), balloonist
 Jacques Piccard (1922–2008), hydronaut
 Jean Piccard (1884–1963), organic chemist, balloonist
 Jeannette Piccard (1895–1981), balloonist, teacher, scientist, priest

References

Scientific families
Swiss families